Chilodes is a genus of moths of the family Noctuidae.

Species
 Chilodes distracta (Eversmann, 1848)
 Chilodes dubiosa (Draudt, 1950)
 Chilodes maritimus – silky wainscot (Tauscher, 1806)
 Chilodes nigrosignata (Graeser, [1889])
 Chilodes pacifica Sugi, 1982

References
 Chilodes at Markku Savela's Lepidoptera and Some Other Life Forms
Natural History Museum Lepidoptera genus database

Hadeninae